Events from the year 1450 in France

Incumbents
 Monarch – Charles VII

Events
 March - French forces besiege the English under Duke of Somerset at Caen as part of the Hundred Years War
 15 April - The Battle of Formigny is fought as part of the Hundred Years War
 6 July - Caen surrenders to the French
 12 August - Cherbourg-en-Cotentin, the last remaining English stronghold in Normandy, surrenders to the French

Deaths
 9 February - Agnès Sorel, royal mistress (born 1422)
 16 September - Louis Aleman, cardinal (born 1390)

References

1450s in France